
Year 177 BC was a year of the pre-Julian Roman calendar. At the time it was known as the Year of the Consulship of Pulcher and Gracchus (or, less frequently, year 577 Ab urbe condita). The denomination 177 BC for this year has been used since the early medieval period, when the Anno Domini calendar era became the prevalent method in Europe for naming years.

Events 
 By place 
 Greece 
 Perseus of Macedonia marries Laodice, the daughter of the Seleucid king Seleucus IV.

 Roman Republic 
 After two military campaigns, the Romans finally subdue the Illyrian tribe of the Histri.
 Luni in northern Italy is founded by the Romans with the name Luna at the mouth of the Magra River.

Deaths 
 Liu Xingju, Chinese prince of the Han Dynasty and a key player during the Lü Clan Disturbance (180 BC), grandson of Emperor Gao of Han and son of Prince Liu Fei of Qi
 Liu Zhang, Chinese prince of the Han Dynasty and a key figure in the anti-Lü clan conspiracy during the Lü Clan Disturbance of 180 BC

References